= El Puesto =

El Puesto may refer to:

- El Puesto (Santa María), a village and municipality in Catamarca Province, Argentina
- El Puesto (Tinogasta), a village and municipality in Catamarca Province, Argentina
