= El Puesto, Santa María =

Coordinates: 26.6461°S 66.0411°W

El Puesto (Santa María)
- Municipality and village
- Interactive map of El Puesto (Santa María)
- Country: Argentina
- Province: Catamarca Province
- Time zone: UTC−3 (ART)

El Puesto (Santa María) is a village and municipality in Catamarca Province in northwestern Argentina.
