= El Puesto, Tinogasta =

Coordinates: 27°57′S 67°38′W

El Puesto (Tinogasta)
- Municipality and village
- Interactive map of El Puesto (Tinogasta)
- Country: Argentina
- Province: Catamarca Province
- Time zone: UTC−3 (ART)

El Puesto (Tinogasta) is a village and municipality in Catamarca Province in northwestern Argentina.
